Yiftahel is an archaeological site located in the Lower Galilee in northern Israel. Various salvage excavations took place here between 1992 and 2008. The best known periods of occupation are the Early Bronze Age I and Pre-Pottery Neolithic B.

In the Early Bronze Age village ca. 20 oval and rounded structures were uncovered. This is regarded as the most typical village of its period in the southern Levant.

The Pre-Pottery Neolithic B village is characterized by rectangular architecture and plastered floors of burnt limestone. One of the most important processes underway during the Neolithic period was the shift from a hunter-gatherer economy to early agriculture. The finds from Yiftahel shed light on the domestication of both animals and plants. Yiftahel produced over 1,000,000 lentils, an enormous quantity, clearly indicating controlled cultivation. The most important agricultural finding here, however, is the earliest appearance of domesticated fava bean seeds.

References
 E. Braun. 1994. Yiftahel. Salvage and Rescue Excavations at a Prehistoric Village in Lower Galilee, Israel. Jerusalem: Internal Publication of the Israel Antiquities Authority.
 Y. Garfinkel. 1987. Yiftahel: A Neolithic Village from the Seventh Millennium B.C. in Lower Galilee, Israel. Journal of Field Archaeology 14: 199–212.
 Y. Garfinkel. 1987. Bead Manufacture at the Pre-Pottery Neolithic B Site of Yiftahel. Mitekufat Haeven (Journal of the Israel Prehistoric Society) 20: 79*–90*.
 Y. Garfinkel. 1987. Burnt Lime Products and Social Implications in the Pre-Pottery Neolithic B Villages of the Near East. Paléorient 13/1: 68–75.
 Y. Garfinkel, I. Carmi and J.C. Vogel. 1987. Dating of Horsebean and Lentil Seeds from the Pre-Pottery Neolithic B Village of Yiftahel. Israel Exploration Journal 37: 40–42.
 Y. Garfinkel. and L.K. Horwitz. 1988. The Pre-Pottery Neolithic B Bone Industry of Yiftahel. Paléorient 14/1: 73–86.
 Y. Garfinkel, M.L. Kislev and D. Zohary. 1988. Lentil in the Pre-Pottery Neolithic B Yiftahel: Additional Evidence of its Early Domestication. Israel Journal of Botany 37: 49–51.
 I. Hershkovitz, Y. Garfinkel and B. Arensburg 1986, Neolithic Skeletal Remains at Yiftahel, Area C. Paléorient 12/1: 73–81.
 L.K. Horwitz. 2003. Temporal and Spatial Variation in Neolithic Caprine Exploitation Strategies: A Case Study of Fauna from the Site of Yiftah’el (Israel). Paléorient 29: 19–58.
 H. Khalaily, I. Milevsky and O. Marder. 2000. Yiftahel. Hadashot Arkheologiyot (Excavations and Surveys in Israel) 112: 23*–24*.
 M.L. Kislev. 1985. Early Neolithic Horsebean from Yiftahel, Israel. Science 228: 319–320.
 M. Lamdan and M. Davies. 1983. Le site de Yiftahel (Israel). L'Anthropologie 87: 273–274.
 R. Malinowski and Y. Garfinkel. 1990, Prehistory of Concrete. Concrete International 13/3: 62–68.
 J. Yellin and Y. Garfinkel. 1986. The Origin of Archaeological Obsidian from a Pre-Pottery Neolithic B Site at Yiftahel, Israel. Paléorient 12/2: 99–104.

Prehistoric sites in Israel
Bronze Age sites in Israel
Ancient sites in Israel
Pre-Pottery Neolithic B
Neolithic settlements
Lower Galilee